Tipula fulvipennis is a species of true craneflies.

Distribution
Widespread throughout the Palaearctic.

References

External links
BioLib

Tipulidae
Diptera of Europe
Diptera of Asia
Insects described in 1776
Taxa named by Charles De Geer